Luch is a village in Mykolaiv Raion, Mykolaiv Oblast (province) of Ukraine. It belongs to Shevchenkove rural hromada, one of the hromadas of Ukraine. 

Until 18 July 2020, Luch was located in Vitovka Raion. The raion was abolished in July 2020 as part of the administrative reform of Ukraine, which reduced the number of raions of Mykolaiv Oblast to four. The area of Vitovka Raion was merged into Mykolaiv Raion.

Luch was seriously damaged in the 2022 Russian invasion of Ukraine, and was rendered a ghost town after almost all of the village's 1,000 residents fled.

References

Notes

Villages in Mykolaiv Raion, Mykolaiv Oblast